George Frater (27 July 1876 – 9 October 1968) was a Scottish professional rugby league footballer who played in the 1890s and 1900s. He played at representative level for Other Nationalities (captain), and Lancashire, and at club level for Oldham (Heritage No. 34), as a forward (prior to the specialist positions of), during the era of contested scrums.

Playing career

International honours
George Frater won a cap playing as a forward, i.e. number 10 (in an experimental 12-a-side match), and was captain, for Other Nationalities in the 9–3 victory over England at Central Park, Wigan on Tuesday 5 April 1904, in the first ever international rugby league match.

Championship appearances
George Frater played in Oldham's victory in the Championship during the 1904–05 season.

References

External links
 (archived by web.archive.org) Statistics at orl-heritagetrust.org.uk
 Representative Honours
 (archived by web.archive.org) Representative Honours
(archived by archive.is) England v Other Nationalities – 5 April 1904 – The First International Rugby League Match
Search for "George Frater" "Rugby" at britishnewspaperarchive.co.uk

1876 births
1968 deaths
Lancashire rugby league team players
Oldham R.L.F.C. players
Other Nationalities rugby league team captains
Other Nationalities rugby league team players
Place of birth missing
Place of death missing
Rugby league forwards
Scottish rugby league players